Today, Tomorrow, and Forever is a 2002 Elvis Presley compilation album released by RCA Records. The album features songs from the early years of Presley on Sun Records to his movie career, 68' Comeback Special, Gospel, Vegas and later years. As indicated on the packaging, none of the tracks in this four-CD set had ever been released previously, as all tracks featured were either alternate studio takes or previously unreleased live performances. The title track of the collection is a (then-)recently discovered outtake from the soundtrack recording sessions for Viva Las Vegas featuring Presley in duet with Ann-Margret.

Track listing

Chart performance

Year-end charts

References

Elvis Presley compilation albums
2002 compilation albums
RCA Records compilation albums
Compilation albums published posthumously